The 1900 Missouri Tigers football team was an American football team that represented the University of Missouri as an independent during the 1900 college football season. The team compiled a 4–4–1 record and was outscored by its opponents by a combined total of 80 to 71. He was replaced by Fred W. Murphy, who led the team for the remainder of the season. The team played its home games at Rollins Field in Columbia, Missouri.

Schedule

References

Missouri
Missouri Tigers football seasons
Missouri Tigers football